The 1977–78 Northern Premier League was the tenth season of the Northern Premier League, a regional football league in Northern England, the northern areas of the Midlands and North Wales. The season began on 21 August 1976 and concluded on 7 May 1978.

Overview
The League featured twenty-four teams.

Team changes
The following club left the League at the end of the previous season:
Gateshead United was Folded. A new club formed Gateshead replaced.

The following club joined the League at the start of the season:
Workington relegated from Football League Fourth Division
Gateshead (new club formed) replaced to the Gateshead United (Club Folded).

League table

Results

Stadia and locations

Cup results

Challenge Cup

Northern Premier League Shield

Between Champions of NPL Premier Division and Winners of the NPL Cup.

FA Cup

Out of the twenty-four clubs from the Northern Premier League, only two teams reached the second round:

Second Round

Third Round

FA Trophy

Out of the twenty-four clubs from the Northern Premier League, two teams reached the fourth round:

Fourth Round

Semi-finals

Final

End of the season
At the end of the tenth season of the Northern Premier League, Wigan Athletic who was put forward for election, received enough votes, on the second round of voting, to be promoted to the Football League.  Great Harwood folded Great Harwood Town replaced in Lancashire Combination

Football League elections
Alongside the four Football League teams facing re-election, two non-League teams, one from the Northern Premier League and the other from the Southern League, applied to be elected.  Three out of the four Football League teams were re-elected.  Wigan Athletic from the Northern Premier League tied with Southport from the Football League on the first round of voting.  A second round was then implemented with Wigan Athletic gaining promotion, replacing Southport from the Football League as they did not receive enough votes.  Southport was subsequently relegated to the Northern Premier League.

Promotion and relegation
The number of clubs reduced from twenty-four clubs to twenty-three clubs for the following season.

The following two clubs left the League at the end of the season:
Wigan Athletic promoted to Football League Fourth Division
Great Harwood folded

The following club joined the League the following season:
Southport demoted from Football League Fourth Division

References

External links
 Northern Premier League official website
 Northern Premier League tables at RSSSF
 Football Club History Database

Northern Premier League seasons
5